Anwar Hossain Khan (born 15 May 1961) is a Bangladesh Awami League politician and the incumbent Jatiya Sangsad member representing the Lakshmipur-1 constituency since 2019.

Career 
Khan is the Chairperson of Anwer Khan Modern Hospital Limited and Director of Bengal Meat. He is the chairperson of Anwer Khan Modern Medical College. He is a Member of parliament Lakshmipur-1, The name of Ramganj Upazila.

References

Living people
1961 births
Awami League politicians
11th Jatiya Sangsad members
Place of birth missing (living people)